Hadi Mohammadi (born 8 March 1991) is an Iranian footballer who plays as a centre back for Persian Gulf Pro League club Tractor.

Club career

Early years
He started his career with Aria Tehran youth levels. Later he joined Saba Qom and Sanat Naft youth academies.

Damash
He joined Damash in summer 2011. He made his debut for Damash on September 15, 2012.

Zob Ahan
After relegation of Damash to Azadegan League, Mohammadi joined Zob Ahan for a fee around 3.5 Billion Rials. He signed a two-year contract with the club and made his debut for it in the first week against Saba Qom.

Club career statistics

International

U–22
He was invited to Iran U–22 squad to compete 2013 AFC U-22 Championship by Alireza Mansourian.

Honours
Zob Ahan
Hazfi Cup: 2014–15, 2015–16

References

External links 
 Hadi Mohammadi  at PersianLeague.com

1991 births
Living people
Damash Gilan players
Zob Ahan Esfahan F.C. players
Iranian footballers
Iran under-20 international footballers
Tractor S.C. players
People from Mahallat
Association football central defenders